Narfi, also Nörfi, Nari or Nörr, is a jötunn in Norse mythology, and the father of Nótt, the personified night.

Name 
The Old Norse name Nǫrr has been related to the Old Saxon  ('night'), a name which occurs in the verse  of the fragmentary Genesis poem. In adjectival form, the Old Norse nǫrr means 'narrow', and the name Nar(f)i may have shared the same meaning.

Thus, the jötunn's name, as first suggested by Adolf Noreen, may be a synonym for "night" or, perhaps more likely, an adjective related to Old English , "narrow", meaning "closed-in" and thus "oppressive".

Snorri Sturluson cites Narfi as an alternative form of the name of the jötunn Nörfi, and the variants Nör and Nörvi also appear in Norse poetry.

Attestations
According to the Gylfaginning section of Snorri Sturluson's Prose Edda, Nótt is the daughter of the jötunn "Nörfi or Narfi". However, in the Poetic Edda, Nótt's father is called Nörr (not to be confused with Nór), primarily for reasons of alliteration. This name is only recorded in the dative form Nǫrvi (variant spelling Naurvi).

The name of Nótt's father is recorded in several forms in Old Norse sources:

Naurr, Nörr (dative Naurvi, Nörvi): "Vafþrúðnismál" 25 "Nótt var Naurvi borin", "Alvíssmál" 29 "Nótt in Naurvi kennda".
Narvi, Narfi: Gylfaginning 10, a poem of Egill Skallagrímsson "niðerfi Narfa".
Norvi, Nörvi: Gylfaginning 10, "Forspjallsljóð" 7 "kund Nörva". 
Njörfi, Njörvi: Gylfaginning 10, "Sonatorrek" "Njörva nipt".
Nori: Gylfaginning 10.
Nari: "Höfuðlausn" 10.
Neri: "Helgakviða Hundingsbana I", 4.

Theories
Various scholars have argued that Snorri based his genealogy of Nótt on classical models. They relate Narfi to Erebus, which would make , used in "Helgakviða Hundingsbana I" for a Norn who comes in the night, an appellation derived from the Parcae, who were Erebus' daughters.

Legacy
In "A Great Man's Return", a song on their album Valdr Galga, the Swedish viking metal band Thyrfing refer to "Norve's starfilled sky".

In J. R. R. Tolkien's The Lord of the Rings Part One, The Fellowship of the Ring, the dwarf maker of the Doors of Durin signed them "Narvi"; in drafts, Tolkien spelt the name Narfi as in the Prose Edda.

In a season 13 episode of Supernatural, Narfi captures and sells the archangel Gabriel to Asmodeus.

Notes

References

Bibliography 

 
 
 

Jötnar